Vasily Tikhonov may refer to:
 Vasily Tikhonov (rower) (born 1960), Soviet rower
 Vasily Tikhonov (equestrian) (1909–1987), Soviet equestrian
 Vasily Tikhonov (ice hockey) (1958–2013), Russian ice hockey coach